Kim Seong-hun (born February 20, 1971) is a South Korean film and television director. He directed How the Lack of Love Affects Two Men (2006), A Hard Day (2014) and Kingdom (2019–).

Career
Kim Seong-hun began his filmmaking career as an assistant director on the romantic comedies Oh! Happy Day (2003; starring Jang Na-ra and Park Jung-chul) and He Was Cool (2004; starring Jeong Da-bin and Song Seung-heon).

In 2006, he directed his first feature film How the Lack of Love Affects Two Men, which follows a widower and his son who both fall for and fight over their new basement tenant (played by Baek Yoon-sik, Bong Tae-gyu and Lee Hye-young). It was a critical and commercial failure, and it would take eight years before he could get his sophomore film funded. Kim said, "It was so embarrassing to realize that was all I could do. [...] I had the firm resolve to give myself one more try before I die."

Inspired by Pedro Almodóvar's Volver, Kim began writing a new screenplay in 2008, finished its first draft in 2009, and continued to edit it until 2013 when filming finally went underway. He cast Lee Sun-kyun as the antihero and Cho Jin-woong as his antagonist in a black comedy/thriller about a corrupt homicide detective who hides the body of a hit-and-run victim in his mother's coffin only to find himself terrorized by a mysterious yet formidable blackmailer. A Hard Day (the Korean title translates to "Take It to the End") premiered in the Directors' Fortnight sidebar of the 2014 Cannes Film Festival where it drew unanimously positive reviews, with Variety praising Kim for "handling a taut yet elaborately plotted narrative with poise, control and near-faultless technical execution." Domestically, A Hard Day had a lackluster opening but strong word of mouth propelled it to becoming a box office hit, with more than 3.4 million tickets sold. The film received numerous awards and nominations, and Kim won Best Director at the 51st Grand Bell Awards, the 1st Korean Film Producers Association Awards, the 6th KOFRA Film Awards, the 20th Chunsa Film Art Awards and 51st Baeksang Arts Awards, as well as Best Screenplay at the 15th Busan Film Critics Awards and 35th Blue Dragon Film Awards.

Filmography

Film 
Oh! Happy Day (2003) - 1st assistant director
He Was Cool (2004) - 1st assistant director, script editor
How the Lack of Love Affects Two Men (2006) - director, script editor
A Hard Day (2014) - director, screenwriter
The Tunnel (2016) - director, screenwriter

Television series 
Kingdom (Netflix, 2019–present) - director
Kingdom: Ashin of the North (Netflix, 2021) - director

Awards 
2014 51st Grand Bell Awards: Best Director (A Hard Day)
2014 15th Busan Film Critics Awards: Best Screenplay (A Hard Day) 
2014 35th Blue Dragon Film Awards: Best Screenplay (A Hard Day)
2014 1st Korean Film Producers Association Awards: Best Director (A Hard Day)
2015 6th KOFRA Film Awards: Best Director (A Hard Day)
2015 20th Chunsa Film Art Awards: Best Director (Grand Prix) (A Hard Day)
2015 51st Baeksang Arts Awards: Best Director (A Hard Day)

References

External links 
 
 
 

1971 births
Living people
South Korean film directors
South Korean screenwriters
Hankuk University of Foreign Studies alumni
People from Gangwon Province, South Korea
Best Director Paeksang Arts Award (film) winners